This is a list of people who died as a result of hanging, including suicides and judicial, extrajudicial, or summary executions. These deaths are notable due to history or due to media exposure.

Suicide by hanging

Ahitophel, counselor of David (c. 1000 BC)
Judas Iscariot, one of the Twelve Apostles of Jesus Christ, who betrayed him for 30 pieces of silver according to the New Testament (c. 30-33 AD) 
Emperor Aizong of Jin, emperor of China's Jin Dynasty (February 14, 1234)
Chongzhen Emperor, emperor of China's Ming dynasty (April 25, 1644)
Gérard de Nerval, French poet and essayist (January 26, 1855)
Philipp Mainländer, German philosopher (April 1, 1876)
Ludwig Boltzmann, Austrian physicist, pioneer of statistical mechanics (September 5, 1906)
Sergei Yesenin, Russian poet, ex-husband of Isadora Duncan (December 27, 1925)
Nishinoumi Kajirō II, Japanese 25th yokozuna (January 27, 1931)
Alberto Santos-Dumont, Brazilian aviation pioneer (July 23, 1932)
Hans Berger, German inventor of electroencephalography (June 1, 1941)
Marina Tsvetayeva, Russian poet (August 31, 1942)
Eduard Wirths, German Nazi Chief SS Auschwitz concentration camp doctor (September 21, 1945)
Leonardo Conti, Nazi Reich Health Leader; in prison cell (6 October 1945)
Robert Ley, German Nazi Reichsorganisationsleiter; in prison cell (25 October 1945) 
Charles Armijo Woodruff, 11th Governor of American Samoa (November 23, 1945)
Rudolf Jung, Nazi Director of Reich Inspection of Labour Administration; in prison cell (11 December 1945)
Robert van Genechten, Dutch collaborator during German Nazi occupation of the Netherlands, in jail cell (13 December 1945) 
Gustav Simon, German Nazi NSKK-Obergruppenführer; in prison cell (18 December 1945)
Hans Bothmann, German Nazi SS commandant of Chełmno extermination camp; while in custody (4 April 1946)
Max Koegel, German Nazi SS commander of Lichtenburg concentration camp, Ravensbrück concentration camp, Majdanek concentration camp, and Flossenbürg concentration camp; in prison cell (27 June 1946)
Carl Schneider, German Nazi Heidelberg University professor, researcher for Nazi euthanasia program; in prison cell (11 December 1946)
Herbert Backe, German Nazi SS Obergruppenführer; in prison cell (6 April 1947)
Irmfried Eberl, Austrian Nazi SS-Obersturmführer psychiatrist, commandant of Treblinka extermination camp (16 February 1948)
Karl Jäger, Swiss-born German Nazi SS Einsatzkommando leader; in prison cell (22 May 1959) 
Wilfrid Garfield Case, Canadian Member of Parliament (22 September 1959)
Hermann Höfle, Austrian-born Nazi SS commander and Holocaust perpetrator; in prison cell (21 August 1962)
Werner Heyde, German Nazi SS psychiatrist, a main organizer of Nazi Germany's Euthanasia Program; in prison cell (13 February 1964)
Frederick Fleet, British lookout on the Titanic who first spotted the iceberg (10 January 1965)
Kurt Bolender, German Nazi SS sergeant who operated Sobibór extermination camp gas chambers; in prison cell (10 October 1966)
Ilse Koch, German Nazi overseer at Buchenwald concentration camp and Majdanek concentration camp; in prison cell (1 September 1967) 
Mack Ray Edwards, American child sex abuser and serial killer; in prison cell (30 October 1971)
Pete Ham, Welsh guitarist and singer of rock band Badfinger (23 April 1975)
Phil Ochs, American political folksinger (9 April 1976)
Ulrike Meinhof, imprisoned member of the German Red Army Faction, (9 May 1976)
David Munrow, British musician and early music historian (15 May 1976)
Gudrun Ensslin, imprisoned member of the German Red Army Faction, circumstances questionable (18 October 1977)
Ian Curtis, English lead singer of Joy Division (18 May 1980)
Trent Lehman, American former child actor of Nanny and the Professor (18 January 1982)
Tom Evans, British member of the rock band Badfinger (19 November 1983)
Richard Manuel, Canadian musician best known for his membership in The Band (4 March 1986)
Rudolf Hess, German Nazi Deputy Führer to Hitler and convicted criminal; in prison (17 August 1987)
Valery Legasov, Soviet chemist and lead investigator of the Chernobyl Disaster (27 April 1988)
Michael Gothard, British actor (2 December 1992)
Buster Edwards, British Great Train Robber (28 November 1994)
Fred West, British serial killer (1 January 1995)
Cheyenne Brando, Tahitian daughter of Marlon Brando (16 April 1995)
Kim Kwang-Seok, South Korean folk rock singer (6 January 1996)
Ray Combs, American host of Family Feud from 1988 to 1994 (2 June 1996)
Terence Donovan, British fashion photographer (22 November 1996)
Michael Hutchence, Australian lead singer of INXS (22 November 1997)
Rozz Williams, American musician, founder of Christian Death (1 April 1998)
Justin Fashanu, British footballer (2 May 1998)
hide, Japanese rock musician (2 May 1998)
Sarah Kane, British playwright (20 February 1999)
Mackey Feary, American lead singer of Hawaiian band Kalapana (20 February 1999)
David Strickland, American actor, best known for his character Todd on Suddenly Susan (22 March 1999)
Petr Lébl, Czech theatre director (11 December 1999)
Justin Pierce, British-born American skateboarder and actor (10 July 2000)
Stuart Adamson, British musician (16 December 2001)
Jon Lee, Welsh drummer with Feeder (7 January 2002)
Maury Travis, American serial killer (10 June 2002)
Ryan Halligan, American 13-year-old schoolboy (7 October 2003)
Jonathan Brandis, American actor (12 November 2003)
Harold Shipman, English doctor and serial killer, convicted of murder and sentenced to life imprisonment (13 January 2004)
Jason Raize, American actor and singer (4 February 2004)
Nafisa Joseph, Indian model and video jockey (29 July 2004)
Norman "Dinky" Diamond, British drummer with Sparks in the 1970s (10 September 2004)
Charlie Brandt, American murderer and suspected serial killer (13 September 2004)
Lee Eun-ju, South Korean actress and singer (22 February 2005)
Paul Hester, former drummer of Crowded House (26 March 2005)
Kuljeet Randhawa, Indian model and actress (8 February 2006)
Megan Meier, American 13-year-old schoolgirl (17 October 2006)
U;Nee, South Korean singer and actress (21 January 2007)
Jung Da Bin, South Korean actress (10 February 2007)
Mike Awesome, American former professional wrestler, twice ECW Champion (17 February 2007)
Kevin Whitrick, British online suicide via webcam (21 March 2007)
Toshikatsu Matsuoka, Japanese politician (28 May 2007)
Chris Benoit, Canadian professional wrestler (24 June 2007)
John David Roy Atchison, US Attorney and children's sports coach, in a prison after being charged with soliciting sex from a child (5 October 2007)
Kunal Singh, Indian actor (7 February 2008)
Mark Speight, British children's television presenter (7 April 2008)
Deborah Jeane Palfrey, operator of an escort agency in Washington, D.C. (1 May 2008)
David Foster Wallace, the American author of Infinite Jest (12 September 2008)
Choi Jin-sil, South Korean actress (2 October 2008)
Kurt Demmler, German songwriter accused of sexual abuse of underage girls; in prison cell (3 February 2009)
Jang Ja-yeon, South Korean actress (7 March 2009)
Lucy Gordon, English actress and model (20 May 2009)
Daul Kim, South Korean-born model who modeled in France (19 November 2009)
Phoebe Prince, a 15-year-old schoolgirl (14 January 2010)
Alexander McQueen, British fashion designer (11 February 2010)
Ambrose Olsen, American male model (22 April 2010)
Choi Jin-young, South Korean brother of Choi Jin-sil (29 March 2010)
Viveka Babajee, Mauritian model and actress (25 June 2010)
Alex Whybrow, American professional wrestler better known as Larry Sweeney (11 April 2011)
Miyu Uehara, Japanese glamour model (12 May 2011)
Andrzej Lepper, former Deputy Prime Minister of Poland and former Minister of Agriculture of Poland (5 August 2011)
Jamey Rodemeyer, American 14-year-old student (September 2011)
Gary Speed, Wales national football team manager and former football player (27 November 2011)
Ivan Pravilov, Ukrainian hockey coach, in prison as he awaited trial for alleged sexual abuse of teenager he coached (10 February 2012)
Amanda Todd, Canadian student and victim of sextortion and bullying (10 October 2012)
Jacintha Saldanha, Indian nurse who worked at King Edward VII's Hospital in the City of Westminster, London (7 December 2012)
Cho Sung-min, South Korean ex-husband of Choi Jin-sil (6 January 2013)
Aaron Swartz, American 26-year-old computer programmer and Internet activist (11 January 2013)
Ram Singh, one of the culprits of the 2012 Delhi gang rape and murder case. He allegedly hanged himself in his cell (11 March 2013)
Jiah Khan, British-American Bollywood actress (3 June 2013)
Gia Allemand, American actress, model, and reality television contestant (14 August 2013)
Ariel Castro, convicted kidnapper and rapist (3 September 2013)
Uday Kiran, South Indian actor (5 January 2014)
Charlotte Dawson, New Zealand-born Australian television personality (22 February 2014)
L'Wren Scott, American fashion model, fashion designer, and costume designer (17 March 2014)
Yoshiki Sasai, Japanese stem cell researcher (5 August 2014)
Robin Williams, American actor and comedian (11 August 2014)
Simone Battle, American X-Factor contestant, singer and member of the band G.R.L (5 September 2014)
Sean O'Haire, American professional wrestler (8 September 2014)
Alok Nembang, Nepali film and music video director (6 November 2014)
Lil' Chris, English singer-songwriter, actor and television personality (23 March 2015)
Joseph A. Bennett, English actor (13 April 2015)
Homaro Cantu, American chef and inventor (14 April 2015)
Kalief Browder, falsely imprisoned African American youth (6 June 2015)
Julia Buencamino, Filipino teen actress (7 July 2015)
Ranganath, South Indian actor (19 December 2015)
Rohith Vemula, Indian PhD student (17 January 2016)
Daryl Easton, American magician (24 February 2017)
Pratyusha Banerjee, Indian television actress (1 April 2016)
Mark Fisher, English writer, music critic, cultural theorist, philosopher and teacher (13 January 2017)
Aaron Hernandez, former NFL player (19 April 2017)
František Rajtoral, Czech footballer (23 April 2017)
Chris Cornell, American musician, frontman of Soundgarden, Audioslave and Temple of the Dog (18 May 2017)
Stevie Ryan, American YouTuber, actress and comedian (1 July 2017)
Chester Bennington, American musician and frontman of Linkin Park, singer and founder/frontman of Dead by Sunrise (20 July 2017)
August Ames, Canadian pornographic actress (5 December 2017)
Mark Salling, American actor (30 January 2018)
Boaz Arad, Israeli artist (2 February 2018)
Jo Min-ki, South Korean actor (9 March 2018)
Kate Spade, American fashion designer (5 June 2018)
Anthony Bourdain, American chef, author, and television personality (8 June 2018)
Oksana Shachko, Ukrainian artist and activist, co-founder of Femen (23 July 2018)
Ellie Soutter, British snowboarder (25 July 2018)
Brian Christopher, American professional wrestler, son of WWE Hall of Famer Jerry "The King" Lawler (29 July 2018)
Brody Stevens, American comedian and actor (22 February 2019)
Keith Flint, English vocalist, dancer and motorcycle racer, frontman of The Prodigy (4 March 2019)
Mike Thalassitis, English television personality and professional footballer (15 March 2019)
Ashley Massaro, American professional wrestler and model (16 May 2019)
David Berman, American musician and poet, founder of the Silver Jews (7 August 2019)
Jeffrey Epstein, American financier, in prison as he awaited trial for alleged sexual abuse of teenager (10 August 2019)
Kodela Siva Prasada Rao, Indian politician (16 September 2019)
Sulli, South Korean singer, songwriter and actress, member of f(x) (14 October 2019)
Kushal Punjabi, Indian actor (26 December 2019)
Stan Kirsch, American actor (11 January 2020)
Caroline Flack, English television and radio presenter (15 February 2020)
Hayden Hunstable, 12 year old son of Brad Hunstable (17 April 2020)
Flávio Migliaccio, Brazilian actor and film director (4 May 2020)
Jas Waters, American screenwriter and journalist (9 June 2020)
Sushant Singh Rajput, Indian actor (14 June 2020)
Haruma Miura, Japanese actor and singer (18 July 2020)
Samir Sharma, Indian television actor (4 August 2020)
Xavier Ortiz, Mexican actor, singer, model, television presenter and entrepreneur (7 September 2020)
Yūko Takeuchi, Japanese actress (27 September 2020)
Ashwani Kumar, Indian police officer and politician (7 October 2020)
Asif Basra, Indian actor (12 November 2020)
Chitra Kamaraj, Indian television actress (9 December 2020)
John McAfee, British-American computer programmer and businessman, founder of McAfee (23 June 2021)
Matt Holmes, British former Commandant General Royal Marines (2 October 2021)
Verónica Forqué, Spanish actress (13 December 2021)
Vaishali Takkar, Indian actress (15 October 2022)
Jason David Frank, American actor, martial artist, wrestling champion, and motivational speaker (19 November 2022)
Tunisha Sharma, Indian television and film actress (24 December 2022)

Capital punishment by hanging

Abdul Rahim Shapiee and Ong Seow Ping, two Singaporean drug traffickers hanged for heroin trafficking (5 August 2022)
Tomohiro Katō, a Japanese mass killer who received the death penalty for committing the 2008 Akihabara massacre (26 July 2022)
Nazeri Lajim, Singaporean drug trafficker and former drug addict hanged for heroin trafficking (22 July 2022)
Norasharee Gous (a Singaporean) and Kalwant Singh Jogindar Singh (a Malaysian), two drug traffickers hanged in Singapore for heroin trafficking. Norasharee Gous was his boss and accomplice (7 July 2022)
Nagaenthran K. Dharmalingam, a Malaysian drug trafficker who was executed in Singapore despite his alleged intellectual disability and the resulting international outcry (27 April 2022)
Abdul Kahar Othman, a 68-year-old Singaporean drug trafficker who is the first to be executed during the COVID-19 pandemic in Singapore (30 March 2022)
Pawan Gupta, Mukesh Singh, Vinay Sharma and Akshay Thakur, the four adult rapists and murderers of the 2012 Delhi gang rape and murder (20 March 2020)
 Wei Wei, a Japan-based Chinese student and one of the three perpetrators of the 2003 Fukuoka family murder case. One of his two accomplices was sentenced to life imprisonment in China while another was executed by the Chinese courts (26 December 2019)
Micheal Anak Garing, Malaysian who robbed and murdered 41-year-old Shanmuganathan Dillidurai during the last of his group's serial armed robbery spree in Kallang, Singapore. (22 March 2019)
 Chia Kee Chen, a Singaporean businessman who murdered his wife's lover Dexmon Chua Yizhi. He was originally sentenced to life imprisonment before the sentence was commuted to the death penalty by the Court of Appeal. (after 27 July 2018)
 Kazuaki Okazaki, a Japanese killer who committed the Sakamoto family murder in 1989, as well as several more murders (26 July 2018)
 Satoro Hashimoto, a Japanese killer and accomplice of Kazuaki Okazaki who committed the Sakamoto family murder in 1989 (26 July 2018)
Shoko Asahara, founder of Japanese doomsday cult Aum Shinrikyo and mastermind behind the Tokyo subway sarin attack in 1995. (6 July 2018)
Rasheed Muhammad and Ramzan Rizwan, the two Pakistani tissue paper sellers who killed and dismembered their Pakistani roommate
Masakatsu Nishikawa, a Japanese serial killer responsible for five murders of bar hostesses (13 July 2017)
Ahmad Najib bin Aris, Malaysian who was sentenced to death in 2005 for abducting, murdering and raping 32-year-old Canny Ong in 2003, for which the case made shocking headlines in Malaysia (23 September 2016)
Kho Jabing, Malaysian who was responsible for the robbery and murder of Chinese national and construction worker Cao Ruyin in Singapore in 2008. (20 May 2016)
Yakub Memon, Indian citizen convicted of involvement in the 1993 Bombay bombings. (30 July 2015)
 Tsukasa Kanda, a Japanese criminal and one of the three culprits of the murder of Rie Isogai. One of his accomplices was sentenced to life imprisonment while another was sentenced to death for an unrelated murder case (25 June 2015)
 Wang Zhijian, Chinese convicted murderer who killed three women in a rental HDB flat in Yishun, Singapore. (after 28 November 2014)
 Abdul Quader Molla, Bangladeshi Islamist leader and politician of the Bangladesh Jamaat-e-Islami, charged with rape and mass murder (12 December 2013)
 Afzal Guru, Indian convicted for the 2001 Indian Parliament attack (9 February 2013)
 Ajmal Kasab, Pakistani militant and a member of the Lashkar-e-Taiba Islamist group, convicted for the 2008 Mumbai attacks (21 November 2012)
Zahra Bahrami, Dutch-Iranian dual citizen, for narcotics trafficking (29 January 2011)
Ali Hassan al-Majid, Iraqi chief of the Iraqi Intelligence Service, military commander, cousin of Saddam Hussein, and war criminal (25 January 2010)
Tan Chor Jin, a former fugitive and gangster who was responsible for the fatal shooting of nightclub owner Lim Hock Soon (9 January 2009)
Mohammed Ali bin Johari, Singaporean Malay and notorious convicted murderer who raped and killed his stepdaughter Nurasyura binte Mohamed Fauzi, who was nicknamed "Nonoi", for which the crime made headlines in Singapore (19 December 2008)
 Tsutomu Miyazaki, Japanese serial killer who killed four young girls between August 1988 and June 1989 before his arrest in July 1989. He was later convicted of murder and sentenced to death in April 1997, and he subsequently spent the final 11 years and 2 months of his life on death row before his execution (17 June 2008)
 Leong Siew Chor, a Singaporean who murdered his lover and dismembered her body into seven pieces (30 November 2007)
Barzan Ibrahim al-Tikriti, half brother of Saddam Hussein, leader of the Mukhabarat, decapitated due to the wrong measurements of the rope (15 January 2007)
Saddam Hussein, President of Iraq and war criminal (30 December 2006)
Took Leng How, Malaysian who murdered Huang Na, a 8-year-old Chinese citizen in Pasir Panjang, Singapore. (3 November 2006)
Khor Kok Soon, one of Singapore's top ten fugitives who was caught in 2003 for the 1984 Shenton Way shooting and murder of a lorry driver
Van Tuong Nguyen, Australian drug trafficker (2 December 2005)
 Yang Ning, a Japan-based Chinese student and one of the three perpetrators of the 2003 Fukuoka family murder case. One of his two accomplices was sentenced to life imprisonment in China while another was executed by the Japanese courts (12 July 2005)
Dhananjoy Chatterjee, Indian convicted of rape and murder of a 14-year-old girl (14 August 2004)
Mamoru Takuma, Japanese mass murderer (14 September 2004)
Anthony Ler, full name Anthony Ler Wee Teang, Singaporean graphic designer who hired and manipulated a 15-year-old male minor to murder his 30-year-old wife Annie Leong Wai Mun (or Annie Leong), who was in the midst of divorcing him. Ler was sentenced to death while his 15-year-old accomplice was spared the death sentence and instead sentenced to indefinite detention at the President's Pleasure (13 December 2002)
Rosli Ahmat, Wan Kamil Mohamed Shafian and Ibrahim Mohamed, the three Singaporean robbers executed for robbing and killing taxi driver Koh Ngiap Yong. (25 October 2002)
Mona Fandey, Malaysian pop singer and convicted killer who was sentenced to death for murdering Malaysian politician Mazlan bin Idris. Her husband Mohamad Nor Affandi bin Abdul Rahman and her assistant Juraimi bin Hassan were also sentenced to death and executed on the same day as her (2 November 2001)
Julaiha Begum, a Singaporean Indian executed for soliciting the murder of her husband T. Maniam, a retired policeman. Her accomplices Loganatha Venkatesan and Chandran Rajagopal were similarly executed. (16 February 2001)
Kiyotaka Katsuta, Japanese serial killer (30 November 2000)
 Lau Lee Peng, a Singaporean fishmonger who committed the brutal robbery and murder of his long-time friend and fruit stall helper Lily Tan Eng Yan at her Tampines flat (1 September 2000)
 Norishyam Mohamed Ali and Shaiful Edham Adam, two Singaporeans who were convicted of killing a Bulgarian student. (2 July 1999)
 Too Yin Sheong, a Malaysian who was one of the three robbers committing the murder of Professor Lee Kok Cheong (April 1999)
 Jonaris Badlishah, a Malaysian and distant nephew of the then Sultan of Kedah who murdered a beautician after he robbed her of her Rolex watch (February 1999)
 Gerardine Andrew, Nazar Mohamed Kassim, and Mansoor Abdullah, who were responsible for the murder of Sivapackiam Veerappan Rengasamy (26 February 1999)
Lim Chin Chong, a Malaysian male prostitute who, at age 18, murdered his male homosexual employer Philip Low Cheng Quee, who operated a male brothel (23 October 1998)
Asogan Ramesh Ramachandren and Selvar Kumar Silvaras, two Singaporean murderers who killed a gangster. A third accomplice Mathavakannan Kalimuthu was granted clemency and re-sentenced to life imprisonment. (29 May 1998)
Jimmy Chua Hwa Soon, a former army sergeant of the Singapore Armed Forces who murdered his sister-in-law Neo Lam Lye and also heavily slashed his four-year-old nephew (February 1998)
Norio Nagayama, Japanese serial killer (1 August 1997)
Zainal Abidin Abdul Malik, Singaporean hotel worker who used an axe to brutally hacked a police officer to death (30 August 1996)
John Martin Scripps, a British spree killer executed in Singapore for killing a South African tourist (19 April 1996)
Rozman Jusoh and Razali Mat Zin, Malaysian odd-job labourers hanged in Singapore for marijuana trafficking (12 April 1996) 
Indra Wijaya Ibrahim, a Singaporean drug addict who robbed and murdered a 80-year-old woman inside a lift at Bedok North (29 September 1995)
S. S. Asokan and Maniam Rathinswamy, two Singaporean security guards found guilty for murdering loan shark Tan Heng Hong and sentenced to death (8 September 1995)
Jamaludin Ibrahim, a Singaporean repairman convicted of killing his two neighbours during a robbery (28 July 1995)
Mohamad Ashiek Salleh and Junalis Lumat, two unemployed Singaporeans found guilty for robbing and killing two taxi drivers and sentenced to death (16 June 1995)
Phua Soy Boon, an unemployed Singaporean found guilty for killing a moneylender and sentenced to death (16 June 1995)
Oh Laye Koh, a Singaporean school bus driver who was found guilty of murdering a 17-year-old Malaysian schoolgirl named Liang Shan Shan in 1989. Oh was also alleged to have killed a 18-year-old lounge waitress Norhayah Mohamed Ali in 1982. (19 May 1995)
Auto Shankar, Indian serial killer (27 April 1995)
Poon Yuen Chung, a Hong Kong tourist executed in Singapore for trafficking 9.5kg of heroin (21 April 1995)
Tong Ching Man and her boyfriend Lam Cheuk Wang, two Hong Kong citizens executed in Singapore for trafficking a total of 3kg of heroin (21 April 1995)
Chin Seow Noi, Chin Yaw Kim and Ng Kim Heng, the three Malaysians who murdered Lim Lee Tin, the girlfriend of Chin Seow Noi (31 March 1995)
Flor Contemplacion, Filipino domestic worker convicted of murder in Singapore (17 March 1995)
Lim Lye Hock, convicted murderer who killed his childhood friend after raping her
Ong Yeow Tian, convicted cop-killer who killed a policeman and shot two other officers with a revolver (25 November 1994)
Ibrahim Masod, convicted murderer who kidnapped a goldsmith for ransom before killing him (29 July 1994)
Goh Hong Choon, convicted murderer who killed a young girl during a robbery (29 July 1994)
Charles Rodman Campbell, convicted murderer (27 May 1994)
Cheuk Mei Mei and Tse Po Chung, both Hong Kong citizens executed in Singapore for drug trafficking (5 March 1994)
Ng Kwok Chun and Hsui Wing Cheung, two drug traffickers from Hong Kong who were executed in Singapore (28 January 1994)
Wong Wai Hung, a Hong Kong national hanged for drug trafficking in Singapore (21 January 1994)
Ng Soo Hin, a Singaporean carpenter sentenced to death for killing his girlfriend Foo Chin Chin and another female friend Ng Lee Kheng (after 4 December 1993)
Maksa Tohaiee, a Singaporean cleaner who was merely 18 years old when he murdered an Italian housewife Clementina Curci during a burglary attempt. He was sentenced to death for murder (26 November 1993)
Raymond Ko Mun Cheung and An Man Keny Chiu Sum Hing, two labourers from Hong Kong who were executed for drug trafficking in Singapore (30 July 1993)
Westley Allan Dodd, American serial killer and child molester (5 January 1993)
Vasavan Sathiadew, who, together with three hired Thai killers, strangled his adoptive brother Frankie Tan to death. He and two of the Thais was sentenced to death for murder. (23 October 1992)
Phan Khenapim, one of the three Thai killers who helped Vasavan Sathiadew to kill Frankie Tan. (23 October 1992)
Wan Pathong, one of the three Thai killers who helped Vasavan Sathiadew to kill Frankie Tan. (23 October 1992)
Hensley Anthony Neville, a Eurasian Singaporean who raped and killed a 19-year-old interior designer named Lim Hwee Huang (28 August 1992)
Lim Joo Yin, a Singaporean contractor who was caught importing 1.37 kg of heroin (3 April 1992)
Ronald Tan Chong Ngee, an unemployed Singaporean who was caught importing 1.37 kg of heroin (3 April 1992)
Lim Beng Hai, a Singaprorean drug addict convicted of killing three people during a robbery (5 October 1990)
Teo Boon Ann, a Singaporean temple medium convicted of killing an elderly woman (20 April 1990)
Lau Chi Sing, the first Hong Kong national to be given the death penalty in Singapore for drug trafficking (17 November 1989)
Sek Kim Wah, former recruit of the Singapore Armed Forces and convicted armed robber and killer who robbed and murdered five people in two separate cases and was thus sentenced to death (9 December 1988)
Adrian Lim, Tan Mui Choo and Hoe Kah Hong, convicted child killers and perpetrators of the 1981 Toa Payoh ritual murders case. (25 November 1988)
Lau Ah Kiang, a jobless Singaporean who used a chopper to kill his adoptive niece Ong Ai Siok (after 18 January 1988)
Ramu Annadavascan, who killed a man by hitting him with a rake and burning him alive (19 September 1986)
Sim Min Teck, one of the three perpetrators of the 1980 Jurong fishing port murders (after 7 July 1986)
Kevin John Barlow and Brian Geoffrey Shergold Chambers, the first two Westerners who were sentenced to death in Malaysia for illegal drug trafficking (7 July 1986)
 Lim Kok Yew, a fugitive and robber who used a firearm while committing the 1979 Tiong Bahru bus hijacking case (8 June 1984)
Yeo Ching Boon, Ong Hwee Kuan and Ong Chin Hock, the three kidnappers and robbers who killed taxi driver Chew Theng Hin and police conscript Lee Kim Lai in two separate cases (24 February 1984)
Kalidass Sinnathamby Narayanasamy, a Singaporean army lance corporal sentenced to hang for molesting and killing his seven-year-old niece Usharani Ganaison (after 17 May 1982)
Botak Chin, real name Wong Swee Chin, Malaysian convicted armed robber who was sentenced to hang for the capital crime of possessing a firearm in Malaysia (11 June 1981)
Quek Kee Siong, Singaporean labourer sentenced to death for the rape and murder of a ten-year-old girl (after 19 November 1980)
Zulfikar Ali Bhutto, Pakistani politician (4 April 1979)
Nadarajah Govindasamy, Singaporean businessman who murdered the fiance of his daughter (28 January 1977)
Kiyoshi Ōkubo, Japanese serial killer (22 January 1976)
Neoh Bean Chye and Lim Kim Huat, the two gunmen hanged for shooting and killing wine shop proprietor Chew Liew Tea (27 June 1975)
Michael X, black revolutionary, for murder (16 May 1975)
Andrew Chou Hock Guan, David Chou Hock Heng, Peter Lim Swee Guan, Konesekaram Nagalingam, Alex Yau Hean Thye, Stephen Francis and Richard James, seven of the ten murderers involved in the 1971 Gold Bars triple murders (28 February 1975)
 Sim Woh Kum, husband and accomplice of Mimi Wong, who murdered a Japanese woman in Singapore (27 July 1973)
 Mimi Wong, the first female prisoner to be executed for murder in Singapore (27 July 1973)
Lee Chor Pet, Lim Kim Kwee and Ho Kee Fatt, the three kidnappers who abducted and killed Ong Beang Leck, the 19-year-old son of a millionaire (27 January 1973)
Deniz Gezmiş, Turkish Marxist-Leninist revolutionary and political activist (6 May 1972)
Akira Nishiguchi, Japanese serial killer (11 December 1970)
Usman bin Haji Muhammad Ali and Harun Thohir, two of the three terrorists responsible for the MacDonald House bombing in Singapore, which killed three people on 10 March 1965 (17 October 1968)
Sunny Ang, a law student and Prix driver who became the first to be executed for a case of murder without a body in Singapore (6 February 1967)
Ronald Ryan (murderer), the last person executed in Australia (3 February 1967)
Tan Kheng Ann, Chia Yeow Fatt, Cheong Wai Sang, Somasundram s/o Subramaniam, Lim Tee Kang, Somasundarajoo s/o Vengdasalam, Lim Kim Chuan, Khoo Geok San, Chan Wah, Hoe Hock Hai, Ponapalam s/o Govindasamy, Chew Seng Hoe, Chew Thiam Huat, Sim Hoe Seng, Ng Cheng Liong, Tan Yin Chwee, Sim Teck Beng and Cheng Poh Kheng, the eighteen rioters who were found guilty of armed rioting and murder of four prison officers at the island prison of Pulau Senang (29 October 1965)
Richard "Dick" Hickock and Perry Edward Smith, murderers of the Clutter family (14 April 1965)
Arthur Lucas and Ronald Turpin, murderers, executed side by side in the last executions performed in Canada (11 December 1962)
Adolf Eichmann, German Nazi major organizer of the Holocaust and war criminal (31 May 1962)
Adnan Menderes, Turkish Prime Minister between 1950–1960 (17 September 1961)
Genzo Kurita, Japanese serial killer (14 October 1959)
Derek Bentley, English man hanged for aiding the murder of a police officer during an attempted robbery (28 January 1953)
Marguerite "Madame le Corbeau" Pitre, Canadian conspirator in the bombing of Canadian Pacific Flight 108, last woman executed in Canada (9 January 1953)
Nathuram Godse, assassin of Mahatma Gandhi (15 November 1949)
Narayan Apte, executed for his role in the assassination of Mahatma Gandhi (15 November 1949)
Yoshio Kodaira, Japanese serial killer (5 October 1949)
Hideki Tōjō, Prime Minister of Japan and war criminal (23 December 1948)
Hans Frank, German Nazi Governor-General of occupied Poland and war criminal (16 October 1946)
Wilhelm Frick, German Nazi Minister of the Interior 1933-1943 and war criminal (16 October 1946)
Alfred Jodl, German Nazi Chief of the Operations Staff of the Oberkommando der Wehrmacht and war criminal (16 October 1946)
Ernst Kaltenbrunner, Austrian Nazi highest surviving SS leader and war criminal (16 October 1946)
Wilhelm Keitel, German Nazi head of the Oberkommando der Wehrmacht and war criminal (16 October 1946)
Joachim von Ribbentrop, German Nazi foreign minister and war criminal (16 October 1946)
Alfred Rosenberg, German Nazi theorist and propagandist and war criminal (16 October 1946)
Amon Göth, Austrian Nazi commandant of the Nazi concentration camp in Płaszów and war criminal (13 September 1946)
Tomoyuki Yamashita, Japanese general and war criminal (23 February 1946)
William Joyce (Lord Haw-Haw), Nazi propagandist (3 January 1946)
Irma Grese, German Nazi concentration camp guard and war criminal (13 December 1945)
Dietrich Bonhoeffer, German theologian (9 April 1945)
Udham Singh, Indian revolutionary (31 July 1940)
Rainey Bethea, last public hanging in U.S., for rape and murder (14 August 1936)
Tarakeswar Dastidar, Indian revolutionary (12 January 1934)
Surya Sen, Indian revolutionary (12 January 1934)
Dinesh Gupta, Indian revolutionary (7 July 1931)
Harikishan Talwar, Indian revolutionary (9 June 1931)
Bhagat Singh, Indian revolutionary (23 March 1931)
Sukhdev, Indian revolutionary (23 March 1931)
Shivaram Rajguru, Indian revolutionary (23 March 1931)
Rajendra Lahiri, Indian revolutionary (17 December 1927)
Ram Prasad Bismil, Indian revolutionary (19 December 1927)
Ashfaqulla Khan, Indian revolutionary (19 December 1927)
Roshan Singh, Indian revolutionary (19 December 1927)
Pramod Ranjan Choudhury, Indian revolutionary (28 September 1926)
Gopinath Saha, Indian revolutionary (1 March 1924)
Kevin Barry, Irish nationalist militant (1 November 1920)
Roger Casement, Irish nationalist (3 August 1916)
Manoranjan Sengupta, Indian revolutionary (15 October 1915)
Niren Dasgupta, Indian revolutionary (15 October 1915)
Basanta Kumar Biswas, Indian revolutionary (11 May 1915)
Hawley Harvey Crippen, convicted wife murderer (23 November 1910)
An Jung-geun, Korean-independence activist, known for Assassinating Itō Hirobumi (26 March 1910)
Satyendranath Basu, Indian revolutionary (21 November 1908)
Khudiram Bose, Indian revolutionary (11 August 1908)
Tom Horn, American frontier scout, lawman, private detective, and hired killer (1903)
Tom "Black Jack" Ketchum, American old west outlaw (26 April 1901)
H. H. Holmes, American serial killer and con man (7 May 1896)
William Henry Bury, murderer and Jack the Ripper suspect (24 April 1889)
Aleksandr Ulyanov, Russian revolutionary and brother of Vladimir Lenin, for plot to assassinate Tsar Alexander III (8 May 1887)
Louis Riel, Canadian political activist, for high treason (6 November 1885)
Charles Guiteau, American assassin of President James A. Garfield (30 June 1882)
Ned Kelly, Australian bushranger, (11 November 1880)
Kate Webster, murderer of Julia Martha Thomas (29 July 1879)
Tom Dula, inspiration for the song "Tom Dooley", for murder (1 May 1868)
Henry Wirz, Confederate commandant of the notorious Andersonville POW camp (10 November 1865)
George Atzerodt, conspirator in the assassination of Abraham Lincoln (7 July 1865)
David Herold, conspirator in the assassination of Abraham Lincoln (7 July 1865)
Lewis Powell, conspirator in the assassination of Abraham Lincoln (7 July 1865)
Mary Surratt, conspirator in the assassination of Abraham Lincoln (7 July 1865)
Boone Helm, American frontier outlaw and serial killer known as "The Kentucky Cannibal" (14 January 1864)
John Brown, militant U.S. anti-slavery activist (2 December 1859)
Jemadar Iswari Prasad, part of Indian Sepoy Mutiny (21 April 1857)
Mangal Pandey, leader of Indian Sepoy Mutiny (8 April 1857)
John André, British officer, for espionage (2 October 1780)
Nathan Hale, American patriot (22 September 1776)
Maharaja Nandakumar, Indian tax collector on false allegations which led to the impeachment of Warren Hastings (5 August 1775)
Nian Gengyao, Chinese military commander of Qing Dynasty (13 January 1726)
Dulla Bhatti, Punjabi who led a revolt against Mughal rule during the rule of the emperor Akbar (1599)
Yue Fei, Chinese military general, calligrapher, and poet of Song Dynasty (28 January 1142)
Yang Guifei, consort of Emperor Xuanzong of Tang who was thought of the cause of An Lushan Rebellion (15 July 756)
Yan Zhenqing, Chinese calligrapher, military general, and politician of Tang Dynasty (785)
Zhangsun Wuji, Chinese chancellor of Tang Dynasty (659)
Emperor Yang of Sui, second and last emperor of Sui dynasty (11 April 618)
Fu Jian, emperor of Former Qin (385)

Accidental hanging

 
 Sada Abe (1905–after 1971), Japanese geisha killed her lover through strangulation while he was sleeping, after having experimented with erotic asphyxiation, in 1936, proceeding to cut off his penis and testicles and carry them around with her in her kimono for three days.
 Vaughn Bodé (1941–1975), American artist, died during autoerotic asphyxiation
 Albert Dekker (1905–1968), American actor, found dead in his bathroom in with a noose around his neck, looped around the shower curtain rod. 
 Frantisek Kotzwara (1730-1791), Czech violinist composer, died during erotic asphyxiation
 Nigel Tetley (c. 1924–1972), British sailor who was the first person to circumnavigate the world solo in a trimaran; his body was found hanging from a tree, clothed in lingerie, considered by the pathologist to have been engaging in masochistic sexual activity.
 Diane Herceg sued Hustler magazine in 1983, accusing it of causing the death of her 14-year-old son, who had experimented with autoerotic asphyxia after reading about it in that publication and whose nude body was found hanging by its neck in closet, while spread at his feet was a copy of Hustler opened to its article on "Orgasm of Death.".
 Stephen Milligan (1948–1994), British politician and Conservative MP for Eastleigh, died from autoerotic asphyxiation, wearing only stockings and suspenders.
 Kevin Gilbert (1966–1996), musician and songwriter, died of apparent autoerotic asphyxiation
 David Carradine (1936–June 3, 2009), American actor died from accidental asphyxiation, according to medical examiner who performed a private autopsy. His body was found hanging by a rope in a closet in his hotel room in Thailand, and there was evidence of a recent orgasm; two autopsies were conducted and concluded that his death was not suicide, and the Thai forensic pathologist who examined the body stated that his death may have been due to autoerotic asphyxiation. Two of Carradine's ex-wives, Gail Jensen and Marina Anderson, stated publicly that his sexual interests included the practice of self-bondage.

References 

 
Hanging